The 2022 Commonwealth Games (officially known as the XXII Commonwealth Games) was a multi-sport event held in Birmingham, England, from 28 July to 8 August 2022. It was the first time that Birmingham hosted the games and also marked England's third time hosting the Commonwealth Games after London 1934 and Manchester 2002, and the seventh Games in the United Kingdom after London and Manchester, Cardiff 1958, Edinburgh 1970 and 1986, and Glasgow 2014.

Rules
The ranking in this table is consistent with International Olympic Committee convention in its published medal tables. By default, the table is ordered by the number of gold medals the athletes from a nation have won (in this context, a "nation" is an entity represented by a Commonwealth Games Association). The number of silver medals is taken into consideration next and then the number of bronze medals. If nations are still tied, equal ranking is given and they are listed alphabetically by their three-letter country code. The following award rule is enforced by the Commonwealth Games Federation (CGF).

For an event to be contested at the Commonwealth Games, there must be at least 3 athletes from two national associations registered. Thus, only the gold medal will be awarded to the first place. This rule expands to the case where only 4 athletes from at least 2 associations are registered. However, only the gold and silver medals will be given to the first and second place respectively. The bronze medal will be given when there are 5 athletes or teams registered in the event. In the case of those sports that are given two bronze medals, the minimum is 7 athletes from 3 countries.

Two bronze medals was awarded  in boxing, judo and wrestling.

No bronze medal was awarded in either the Women's Marathon T54 event, the Women's Tandem B Cycling and in the women's 53 kg freestyle wrestling event as there were only four entries in each event. Only one bronze was awarded in the women's 50 kg freestyle wrestling event as there was only six entries. 

Additionally, two silver medals were awarded in the Women's 50m butterfly and Men's 100m butterfly swimming events, as a result of a tie between two athletes in each respective event.

Accomplishments
The Gambia  its first silver medal in the history of the Commonwealth Games,when the judoka Faye Njie won the silver medal  in the men's 73 kg judo event,the country was having only ever won a single bronze medal previously  at (1970 games).

Niue won its first medal ever when the boxer Duken Tutakitoa-Williams won one of the two bronze medals in the men's heavyweight boxing.

Medal table 
See also
All-time Commonwealth Games medal table
References

Medal table
Commonwealth Games medal tables